Melissa Salmons is an American writer known for her work on television soap operas, known for her work on Days of Our Lives.

Positions held
Another World 
Script Writer (1999 – June 25, 1999)

As the World Turns 
Script Writer (1997–1998, July 21, 2004 – August 4, 2006)

Days of Our Lives 
Script Writer (August 17, 2012 – November 1, 2016)

Guiding Light 
Script Writer (1987–1991, 2000 – July 2004)

One Life to Live 
Script Writer (May 26, 2009 – January 13, 2012)

The Young and the Restless 
Script Writer (October 22, 2008 – March 23, 2009)

Awards and nominations
Daytime Emmy Awards

WINS 
(1990; Best Writing; Guiding Light)
(2005; Best Writing; As the World Turns)

NOMINATIONS 
(1989, 1992 & 2003; Best Writing; Guiding Light)
(2006; Best Writing; As the World Turns)
(2014; Best Writing; Days of Our Lives)

Writers Guild of America Award

WINS
(1992 season; Guiding Light)
(2007 season; As the World Turns)
(2010 season; The Young and the Restless)
(2014 season; Days of Our Lives)

NOMINATIONS 
(1989, 2002 & 2003 seasons; Guiding Light)
(1998, 1999 & 2006 seasons; As the World Turns)
(2010, 2011 & 2013 seasons; One Life to Live)
(2013 & 2015 seasons; Days of Our Lives)

References

External links
 

American soap opera writers
Daytime Emmy Award winners
Living people
Women soap opera writers
American women television writers
Writers Guild of America Award winners
Year of birth missing (living people)